Gemmulimitra rubiginosa is a species of sea snail, a marine gastropod mollusk in the family Mitridae, the miters or miter snails.

Description
The shell size varies between 24 mm and 50 mm

Distribution
This species is distributed in the Eastern Indian Ocean; in the Pacific Ocean along Papua New Guinea; Fiji, the Philippines

References

 Cernohorsky W. O. (1976). The Mitrinae of the World. Indo-Pacific Mollusca 3(17) page(s): 423

External links
 

Mitridae
Gastropods described in 1844